Gabroo Punjab Da is a 1986 Indian Punjabi-language action film directed by Jagjit Gill. It was made after the success of Punjabi film Putt Jattan De, which became a trendsetter in Punjabi action movies. Gurdas Maan and Rama Vij played lead roles in this movie. Gugu Gill came as an actor first time in this movie, he played the villain role in this movie, which was a milestone for his career.

Star cast
Gurdas Maan as Shera
Guggu Gill as Jagroop 'Jaggu'
Rekesh Pandey as Fauji Amar
Rama Vij as Leelo 
Mehar Mittal
Surinder Sharma as Kharku
Manjit Maan as Reshma
Sangita Mehta
Didar Sandhu as himself
Amar Noorie as herself

See also

 List of Indian Punjabi films

References 

Punjabi-language Indian films
1980s Punjabi-language films
1986 action films
1986 films